The Bytantay (Bıtantay) is a river in the Republic of Sakha in Russia.

Course 
It heads roughly northeast with the Kular Range to the northwest and then joins river Yana from the left  from its mouth. There are more than two thousand lakes in the basin of the Bytantay.

The main tributaries of the Bytantay are Billah and Tenki on the right; and Khobol, Achchygy-Sakkyryr, Ulakhan-Sakkyryr and Kulgaga-Suoh on the left. The Ulakhan-Sakkyryr joins the Bytantay a short distance to the east of Batagay-Alyta.

See also
List of rivers of Russia
Yana Plateau
Yana-Oymyakon Highlands§Hydrography

References

Rivers of the Sakha Republic
Verkhoyansk Range